Amanda Reid   (born 12 November 1996) is an Australian Paralympic swimmer and cyclist. She represented Australia at the 2012 Summer Paralympics in swimming. At the 2016 Summer Paralympics, she won a silver medal in the Women's 500 m Time Trial C1–3 and at the 2020 Tokyo Paralympics a gold medal in 500 m Time Trial C1–3. In 2023, she won a gold medal at the 2023 World Para Snowboard Championships]].

Personal
Reid was born on 12 November 1996 with spastic quadriplegia and an intellectual disability. She is from Blaxland, New South Wales. Reid has heritage from the Wemba-Wemba and Guringai people. She attended Blaxland High School and Endeavour Sports High School.

Career

Swimming

Reid was an S14 classified swimmer. She was classified as an S8 swimmer for the 2015 New South Wales Multi-Class Championships. She was a member of Woy Woy Swim club. At the 2010 Australian All Schools Swimming Championships, she won ten medals, eight of which were gold. She competed at the 2011 Global Games as a fourteen-year-old. She was selected to represent Australia at the 2012 Summer Paralympics in swimming competing in the S14 100 metre breaststroke event.

Cycling

After the 2012 London Paralympics, she transferred to cycling. At her first major international competition, she won a silver medal in the Women's C2 500 m Time Trial at the 2016 UCI Para-cycling Track World Championships in Montichiari, Italy.

At the 2016 Summer Paralympics, she won a silver medal in the Women's 500 m Time Trial C1–3. Her other results were 11th in both the Women's Road Time trial C1–3 and Women's Road Race C1-3.

In 2016, she was a New South Wales Institute of Sport scholarship holder.

At the 2017 UCI Para-cycling Track World Championships in Los Angeles, Reid won gold medals in the Women's 500 m Time Trial C2 and Women's 3 km Individual Pursuit C2 and a silver medal in the Women's Scratch Race C1–3.

At the 2018 UCI Para-cycling Track World Championships in Rio de Janeiro, Brazil, she won the silver medal in the Women's 500 m Time Trial C2.

At the 2019 UCI Para-cycling Track World Championships in Apeldoorn, Netherlands, Reid won the gold medal in the Women's 500 m Time Trial C2 in a new world record time of 39.505 seconds and a silver medal in the Women's Scratch Race C1–C2.

At the 2020 UCI Para-cycling Track World Championships in Milton, Ontario, she won two gold medals - Women's  Time Trial C2 and Women's Omnium C2.

Reid won her first Paralympic gold medal in the Women's 500 m Time Trial C1-3 at the 2020 Tokyo Paralympics in a world record time of 35.581. She also competed in the Mixed team sprint C1-5 together with Meg Lemon and Gordon Allan. The team came ninth.

At the 2022 UCI Para-cycling Road World Championships in Baie-Comeau, Reid finished fourth in The Women's Time Trial C2 and did not finish the Women's Road Race C2.

At the 2022 UCI Para-cycling Track World Championships in  Saint-Quentin-en-Yvelines, France, she won the gold medals in the Women's Time Trial C2, Women's Omnium C2, and Women's Scratch Race C2, along with a silver medal in the Women's Individual Pursuit C2.

Snowboarding
Reid won the gold medal in the Women's Snowboard Cross SB-LL1 at the 2023 World Para Snowboard Championships held at La Molina.

Controversy
In 2018, it was reported that Reid's former coach Simon Watkins accused her of exaggerating her physical and intellectual conditions and symptoms. The Australian Paralympic Committee dismissed these allegations, describing them as "opinion" by a non-medical professional, saying that she had been through "rigorous assessment processes" and that it was "not uncommon to change classifications".

Recognition
2017 – NAIDOC Sports Person of the year
2017 – New South Wales Athlete with a Disability
2017 – Australia Day Ambassador for the Dubbo Regional Council
2017 - Sport Australia Hall of Fame Scholarship
2022 – Medal of the Order of Australia for service to sport as a gold medallist at the Tokyo Paralympic Games 2020

References

External links

Australian Cycling Team Profile

Living people
1996 births
Australian female cyclists
Australian female snowboarders
Cyclists from New South Wales
Female Paralympic swimmers of Australia
Indigenous Australian Paralympians
Paralympic cyclists of Australia
Paralympic snowboarders of Australia
Swimmers at the 2012 Summer Paralympics
Cyclists at the 2016 Summer Paralympics
Cyclists at the 2020 Summer Paralympics
Paralympic gold medalists for Australia
Paralympic silver medalists for Australia
Medalists at the 2016 Summer Paralympics
Medalists at the 2020 Summer Paralympics
Australian female breaststroke swimmers
S14-classified Paralympic swimmers
People educated at Endeavour Sports High School
Paralympic medalists in cycling
Recipients of the Medal of the Order of Australia